Miroslav Ondříček (4 November 1934 – 28 March 2015) was a Czech cinematographer who worked on over 40 films, including Amadeus, Ragtime and If.....

Life and career
Miroslav Ondříček was born in Prague, Czechoslovakia (now Prague, Czech Republic). He studied filmmaking at the Barrandov Studio Training School and began making movies during the Czech New Wave. His first feature film work was on Miloš Forman's Talent Competition. He continued his long working relationship with Forman in the US on such films as Hair (1979), Ragtime (1981) and Amadeus (1984). He also collaborated with the British film director Lindsay Anderson on two films: If.... (1968) and O Lucky Man! (1973).

Family
He is the father of the film director David Ondříček, and was a member of the board of the Film School in Pisek.

Death
Ondříček died in Prague at the age of 80.

Selected filmography
Riding in Cars with Boys (2001)
The Preacher's Wife (1996)
Let It Be Me (1995)
A League of Their Own (1992)
Awakenings (1990)
Valmont (1989)
Funny Farm (1988)
Big Shots (1987)
F/X (1986)
Heaven Help Us (1985)
Amadeus (1984)
Silkwood (1983)
The World According to Garp (1982)
Ragtime  (1981)
Dark Sun (1980)
Hair (1979)
The Divine Emma (1979)
O Lucky Man! (1973)
If.... (1968)
The Fireman's Ball (1967)
Loves of a Blonde (1965)

Awards

Academy Awards (Oscars)
 Nominated – 1984 Best Achievement in Cinematography for Amadeus
 Nominated – 1981 Best Achievement in Cinematography for Ragtime

BAFTA Film Awards
 Won – 1984 Best Cinematography for Amadeus

References

External links

1934 births
2015 deaths
Czech cinematographers
Best Cinematography BAFTA Award winners
Recipients of Medal of Merit (Czech Republic)
Mass media people from Prague